Ramouli is a village in Benipur Block in Darbhanga Division, Darbhanga District of Bihar State, India.

Villages in Darbhanga district